Han Shaogong (born January 1, 1953) is a Chinese novelist and fiction writer.

Biography
Han was born in Hunan, China. While relying on traditional Chinese culture, in particular Chinese mythology, folklore, Taoism and Buddhism as source of inspiration, he also borrows freely from Western literary techniques. As a teenager during the Cultural revolution he was labeled an ‘educated youth’ and sent to the countryside for re-education through labour. Employed at a local cultural center after 1977, he soon won recognition as an outspoken new literary talent. His early stories attacked the ultra-leftist degradation of China during the Mao era; they tended toward a slightly modernist style. However, he reemerged in the mid-1980s as the leader of an avant-garde school, the "Search for Roots" or the Xungen Movement.

Work
Han's major work to date is A Dictionary of Maqiao, a novel published in 1996 and translated into English in 2003. His writing is influenced by Kafka and by the magic realism of Gabriel García Márquez. In 1987, he published a Chinese translation of Milan Kundera's The Unbearable Lightness of Being and edited Hainan Jishi Wenxue ("Hainan Documentary Literature"), a successful literary magazine. He has been given the French Ordre des Arts et des Lettres and with other Chinese writers visited France in 1988 at the invitation of the French Ministry of Culture. Han was invited back in 1989 but was denied permission to leave China until 1991.

Han's other works include Moon Orchid (1985), Bababa (1985), Womanwomanwoman (1985), Deserted City (1989), and Intimations (2002).

Awards
 In 2011 Han was awarded the Newman Prize for Chinese Literature.

References

External links
 Han Shaogong Wins 2011 Newman Prize for Chinese Literature 
 Introduction to Han Shaogong
 Columbia University Press publicity page for A Dictionary of Maqiao
 Article about Intimations in Chinese Daily (in English)

1953 births
Living people
Magic realism writers
Writers from Changsha
Chinese male novelists
20th-century Chinese short story writers
Chinese male short story writers
20th-century Chinese male writers
People's Republic of China short story writers
Short story writers from Hunan